The Entertainer is a 1972 solo album by jazz pianist Jaki Byard.

Recording and music
The album was recorded for the Japanese label Victor. The material is diverse: "ragtime, to classic jazz, standards, and pop fluff of the 1970s, along with the pianist's creative originals".

Releases
It was released by Victor. The LP was also released by Storyville.

Track listing
"My Man's Gone Now"
"Chicago Breakdown"
"Tony"
"(They Long to Be) Close to You"
"Blues for Smokes Brother"
"The Entertainer"
"Django"
"Something's Gotta Give"

Personnel
Jaki Byard – piano

References

Jaki Byard albums
Solo piano jazz albums